Cupressus goveniana, now reclassified as Hesperocyparis goveniana, with the common names Californian cypress and Gowen cypress, is a species of cypress, that is endemic to California.

Distribution
The tree is endemic to the Monterey Peninsula in coastal Monterey County, located on the Central Coast of California, in the Western United States.

The tree is found in small, scattered populations, and not in large forests of its species. Hesperocyparis goveniana occurs with Hesperocyparis macrocarpa (Monterey cypress), in the two groves where the Monterey cypress occurs naturally, in Monterey County. Outside of California, Hesperocyparis goveniana has been introduced to Robinson Crusoe Island in Chile.

It is on the IUCN Red List of endangered species.

Description

The foliage grows in dense sprays, dark green to somewhat yellow-green in color.

The cones remain closed for many years, only opening after the parent tree is killed in a wildfire, thereby allowing the seeds to colonize the bare ground exposed by the fire.

Typically cones of H. goveniana are smaller than those of H. macrocarpa.

Taxonomy
The varieties or subspecies, formerly included under Cupressus goveniana by some botanists, include:
Cupressus goveniana var. goveniana — reclassified as Hesperocyparis goveniana.
Monterey County, strictly coastal, within  of the coast and below  altitude. Foliage dark green, not rough, with leaf tips not spreading; cones globose.
Cupressus goveniana var. pigmaea, reclassified as Hesperocyparis pygmaea — Mendocino cypress (vulnerable species). 
Mendocino and Sonoma counties, coastal, within  of the coast and below  altitude.
Cupressus goveniana var. abramsiana, reclassified as Hesperocyparis abramsiana —  Santa Cruz cypress (endangered species).
With yellow–green foliage slightly rough-textured from the acute and slightly spreading leaf tips; cones often oval.

References

External links
Jepson Manual eFlora treatment of Hesperocyparis goveniana
CalFlora Database: Hesperocyparis goveniana (Gowen cypress)

goveniana
Endemic flora of California
Natural history of the California chaparral and woodlands
Natural history of the California Coast Ranges
Natural history of Monterey County, California
Trees of the Southwestern United States
Plants described in 1849